Lithia Springs High School is a public high school located on East County Line Road, in Lithia Springs, Georgia, United States. It is also known as Lithia Springs Comprehensive High School. It was the second high school to open in the Douglas County School District.

History 
Until December 2, 1975, Douglas County had only one high school, Douglas County High School, which opened in the late 1930s. By 1974 the secondary school population had grown to over 3,000 students, far too many for the existing buildings of DCHS to accommodate in a regular school day. Beginning in August 1974, the county had to resort to double sessions. This meant that those students designated to attend Lithia Springs High School would attend the afternoon session, starting at about 11:00 and going until about 5:30. Construction and weather problems delayed the opening of LSHS until December 1975.

STEM Magnet Program 
Lithia Springs High School is home to Douglas County's Science, Technology, Engineering, and Mathematics (STEM) Magnet program. Use of Project Lead the Way's (PLTW) specialized curriculum in Biomedical Science, Computer Science, and Engineering distinguishes the STEM Magnet program from all other STEM pathways offered in DCSS. Three separate agencies, each with its own rigorous and comprehensive certification process, have recognized the quality and value of the LSHS STEM program: the Georgia Department of Education (2016), Cognia Accreditation, formally AdvancED (2017), and the National Institute for STEM Education (2019).
With personalized learning opportunities, STEM students are empowered to work collaboratively on complex, open-ended tasks. Through an inquiry-based approach for building knowledge and blended learning experiences, instructors develop a more inclusive, interactive and creative approach to teaching. As a result, students develop self confidence, independence, and pride in their accomplishments as they use newly acquired content knowledge to explore, design, test, modify, and solve problems which exist in the real world.
Graduates of the STEM program satisfy a diverse array of rigorous expectations, including AP and Dual Enrollment courses, to develop a comprehensive portfolio and résumé for their post-secondary endeavors.

Demographics 
 teachers: 86.1 (FTE)

Students by grade:
Grade 9: 488
Grade 10: 433
Grade 11: 347
Grade 12: 299

Notable alumni
 Lil Nas X, singer/rapper
 Walton Goggins, actor, best known for his roles on the FX Networks series The Shield and Justified
 Elana Meyers, Olympic  bobsledding bronze medalist in 2010, silver medalist in 2014, and silver medalist in 2018
 Calvin Pace, outside linebacker, New York Jets #97
 Kevin Abstract, director, producer, rapper 
 Josh Scogin, rock musician

References

External links

 Lithia Springs High School
 Public School Review

Public high schools in Georgia (U.S. state)
Schools in Douglas County, Georgia
Educational institutions established in 1975
1975 establishments in Georgia (U.S. state)